Tuck rule may refer to:

 Tuck rule (American football)
 Tuck Rule Game, the 2001 AFC Divisional Playoff game between the New England Patriots and the Oakland Raiders
 Tuck rule (ice hockey)